Division No. 8 is a census division in Alberta, Canada. It is located in the south-central portion of central Alberta and includes the City of Red Deer and surrounding areas. The division forms the central segment of the Calgary–Edmonton Corridor. Division No. 8 is the smallest census division in Alberta according to area.

Census subdivisions 
The following census subdivisions (municipalities or municipal equivalents) are located within Alberta's Division No. 8.

Cities
Lacombe
Red Deer
Towns
Bentley
Blackfalds
Bowden
Eckville
Innisfail
Penhold
Ponoka
Rimbey
Sylvan Lake
Villages
Alix
Clive
Delburne
Elnora
Summer villages
Birchcliff
Gull Lake
Half Moon Bay
Jarvis Bay
Norglenwold
Parkland Beach
Sunbreaker Cove
Municipal districts
Lacombe County
Ponoka County
Red Deer County
Indian reserves
Montana 139   
Samson 137  
Samson 137A

Demographics 

See also 
List of census divisions of Alberta
List of communities in Alberta

References

D08